Vladimir Borisovich Skokov (born June 11, 1972) is a Russian professional football coach and a former player. He made his professional debut in the Soviet Second League in 1990 for FC Zarya Kaluga.

Honours
 Russian Premier League bronze: 1997.
 Russian Cup winner: 2004.
 Russian Cup finalist: 1997, 1999 (played in the early stages of the 1998/99 tournament for FC Dynamo Moscow).

European club competitions
 UEFA Intertoto Cup 1997 with FC Dynamo Moscow: 4 games.
 UEFA Cup 1998–99 with FC Dynamo Moscow: 2 games.
 UEFA Cup 2004–05 with FC Terek Grozny: 3 games.

References

1972 births
People from Kamensk-Shakhtinsky
Living people
Soviet footballers
Russian footballers
Russian expatriate footballers
Expatriate footballers in Latvia
FC Rostov players
Russian Premier League players
FC Dynamo Moscow players
FC Shinnik Yaroslavl players
FC Akhmat Grozny players
FC Fakel Voronezh players
FC Daugava players
FC Sokol Saratov players
FC Metallurg Lipetsk players
Russian expatriate sportspeople in Latvia
FC Taganrog players
Association football midfielders
Sportspeople from Rostov Oblast